"Pretty Savage" is a song recorded by South Korean girl group Blackpink from their debut Korean studio album The Album. It was released on October 2, 2020, through YG and Interscope. The track was written by Teddy, Danny Chung, Løren and Vince, with production being handled by Teddy alongside 24, R. Tee and Bekuh Boom. Lyrically, the song deals with the group not caring about the opinion of others. The song was performed with "Lovesick Girls" on several music programs in South Korea including Show! Music Core and Inkigayo and also at The Late Late Show With James Corden as a preview performance for their headlining livestream concert, The Show.
 
"Pretty Savage" debuted in the national charts of several countries, including Australia, Canada, Malaysia, New Zealand, Singapore and South Korea. Although it did not enter the US Billboard Hot 100, it debuted at number 21 on the Bubbling Under Hot 100 chart.

Background and promotion
"Pretty Savage" was confirmed with the album's tracklist on September 28, 2020. "Pretty Savage" was performed with "Lovesick Girls" on music and variety shows with in October following the release of the album. On October 10, the group made the debut performance of the song at MBC's Show! Music Core. The next day Blackpink performed the song on Inkigayo.

Blackpink also did an interview with James Corden on The Late Late Show With James Corden as part of the group's US promotion for their virtual concert "The Show" and then performed the track as a preview for the said concert. The Japanese version of the track was released as part of The Album -JP Ver.- which was made available on August 3, 2021.

Composition

"Pretty Savage" was written by Teddy, Danny Chung, Løren and Vince, with production being handled by Teddy alongside 24, R. Tee and Bekuh Boom. The song runs for a duration of three minutes and nineteen seconds. "Pretty Savage" is a trap song with "haunted vocals and a skittish, staccato-style beat", those lyrics are a "collective middle finger to the haters". The song is about how the group's success comes by being different from everyone else.

Critical reception
The song was met with generally positive reviews from critics. Writing for Billboard, Jason Lipshutz ranked "Pretty Savage" as the best song on the album, calling it "hypnotic during its ferocious high points" and one of the best Blackpink songs. Callie Ahlgrim from Insider called "Pretty Savage" a "straight shot of adrenaline" and noted that the lyrics "Yeah, we some bitches you can't manage" are an "ace-in-the-hole". Writing for Rolling Stone, Tim Chan labelled it as the "sassiest kiss-off track since" Ariana Grande's "Thank U, Next". In a more negative review, Mikael Wood for the Los Angeles Times described the song, alongside "How You Like That", as "two vaguely phrased declarations of fierce self-determination".

Credits and personnel
Credits adapted from Tidal and the group's official website.

 Blackpink – vocals
 Teddy – producer, lyricist, composer, arranger
 24 – producer, composer, arranger
 R. Tee – producer, composer, arranger
 Bekuh Boom – composer
 Danny Chung – lyricist
 Løren – lyricist
 Vince – lyricist
 Jason Roberts – mixer

Usage in media
"Pretty Savage" was featured in the 2021 Netflix film To All the Boys: Always and Forever. South Korean boy band iKon performed a remake of the song entitled "Classy Savage" with a guest appearance by  Lisa in the 2021 Mnet competition show Kingdom: Legendary War. "Pretty Savage" is featured in the soundtrack of the 2021 Brazilian telenovela Quanto Mais Vida, Melhor!, which was bradcoast beginning in November 2021.

Charts

Weekly charts

Monthly charts

See also

List of K-pop songs on the Billboard charts

References

 

Blackpink songs
2020 songs
Songs written by Teddy Park